The 2004 Pocono 500 was the 14th stock car race of the 2004 NASCAR Nextel Cup Series season and the 23rd iteration of the event. The race was held on Sunday, June 13, 2004, before a crowd of 90,000 in Long Pond, Pennsylvania, at Pocono Raceway, a 2.5 miles (4.0 km) triangular permanent course. The race took the scheduled 200 laps to complete. At race's end, Jimmie Johnson of Hendrick Motorsports would win the race under caution, after Jeff Burton blew an engine on lap 196. The win was Johnson's ninth NASCAR Nextel Cup Series career win and his third win of the season. To fill out the podium, Jeremy Mayfield of Evernham Motorsports and Bobby Labonte of Joe Gibbs Racing would finish second and third, respectively.

Background 

The race was held at Pocono Raceway, which is a three-turn superspeedway located in Long Pond, Pennsylvania. The track hosts two annual NASCAR Sprint Cup Series races, as well as one Xfinity Series and Camping World Truck Series event. Until 2019, the track also hosted an IndyCar Series race.

Pocono Raceway is one of a very few NASCAR tracks not owned by either Speedway Motorsports, Inc. or International Speedway Corporation. It is operated by the Igdalsky siblings Brandon, Nicholas, and sister Ashley, and cousins Joseph IV and Chase Mattioli, all of whom are third-generation members of the family-owned Mattco Inc, started by Joseph II and Rose Mattioli.

Outside of the NASCAR races, the track is used throughout the year by Sports Car Club of America (SCCA) and motorcycle clubs as well as racing schools and an IndyCar race. The triangular oval also has three separate infield sections of racetrack – North Course, East Course and South Course. Each of these infield sections use a separate portion of the tri-oval to complete the track. During regular non-race weekends, multiple clubs can use the track by running on different infield sections. Also some of the infield sections can be run in either direction, or multiple infield sections can be put together – such as running the North Course and the South Course and using the tri-oval to connect the two.

Entry list

Practice

First practice 
The first practice session would take place on Friday, June 11, at 11:20 AM EST, and would last for two hours.

Second practice 
The second practice session would occur on Saturday, June 12, at 9:30 AM EST, and would last for 45 minutes.

Third and final practice 
The third and final practice session, sometimes referred to as Happy Hour, would occur on Saturday, June 12, at 11:10 AM EST, and would last for 45 minutes.

Qualifying 
Qualifying would occur on Friday, June 11, at 3:05 PM EST. Each driver would have two laps to set a fastest time; the fastest of the two would count as their official qualifying lap. Positions 1-38 would be decided on time, while positions 39-43 would be based on provisionals. Four spots are awarded by the use of provisionals based on owner's points. The fifth is awarded to a past champion who has not otherwise qualified for the race. If no past champ needs the provisional, the next team in the owner points will be awarded a provisional.

Two drivers would fail to qualify: Stanton Barrett and Andy Hillenburg.

Full qualifying results

Race results

References 

2004 NASCAR Nextel Cup Series
NASCAR races at Pocono Raceway
June 2004 sports events in the United States
2004 in sports in Pennsylvania